Higgston is a town in Montgomery County, Georgia, United States. The population was 314 at the 2020 census. It is part of the Vidalia Micropolitan Statistical Area.

History
The Georgia General Assembly incorporated the place as the Town of Higgston in 1903. The community was named after James Higgs, proprietors of several local mills.

Geography
Higgston is located in northeastern Montgomery County at  (32.217330, -82.467332). U.S. Route 280 passes through the south side of town, leading west  to Mount Vernon, the county seat, and east  to Vidalia. State Routes 15 and 29 pass through the center of Higgston together as James Street and lead northwest  to Soperton, while State Route 135 leads south from US 280 13 miles to Uvalda.

Rocky Creek passes through the east side of town, flowing southeast to the Ohoopee River in Tattnall County.

Demographics

As of the census of 2000, there were 316 people, 134 households, and 84 families residing in the town. The racial makeup of the town was 79.11% White, 19.30% African American, 0.63% from other races, and 0.95% from two or more races. Hispanic or Latino of any race were 0.95% of the population.

There were 134 households, out of which 32.8% had children under the age of 18 living with them, 41.8% were married couples living together, 17.9% had a female householder with no husband present, and 37.3% were non-families. 34.3% of all households were made up of individuals, and 9.0% had someone living alone who was 65 years of age or older.  The average household size was 2.36 and the average family size was 3.06.

In the town the population was spread out, with 27.8% under the age of 18, 9.5% from 18 to 24, 32.9% from 25 to 44, 20.6% from 45 to 64, and 9.2% who were 65 years of age or older.  The median age was 34 years. For every 100 females, there were 79.5 males.  For every 100 females age 18 and over, there were 81.0 males.

The median income for a household in the town was $28,854, and the median income for a family was $29,896. Males had a median income of $26,250 versus $21,250 for females. The per capita income for the town was $13,797.  About 22.2% of families and 21.8% of the population were below the poverty line, including 33.3% of those under age 18 and 9.5% of those age 65 or over.

Notable people
J. Ollie Edmunds, fourth president of Stetson University

References

Towns in Montgomery County, Georgia
Towns in Georgia (U.S. state)
Vidalia, Georgia, micropolitan area